Holochlora is a genus of bush-crickets in the subfamily Phaneropterinae. They occur in Africa (Mozambique and Madagascar) and Asia (widespread from India to Malesia).

Species 
Species include:

References

External links

Holochlora image in Farangs gone wild: Tettigonioidea of Thailand

 
Tettigoniidae genera
Orthoptera of Africa
Orthoptera of Asia
Orthoptera of Indo-China